Runa Basu, born in Calcutta, West Bengal, is a former Test and One Day International cricketer who represented India. She also represented Bengal in India's domestic league. She played six Test matches and one One Day International.

References

Bengal women cricketers
Bengali cricketers
Cricketers from Kolkata
India women One Day International cricketers
India women Test cricketers
Indian women cricketers
Living people
University of Calcutta alumni
Sportswomen from Kolkata
1955 births